The Olympics class is a class of Chinese submarines. The first submarine was visible on a video February 8 2022 on Chinese social media. The official name of the class is not known, but the nickname Olympics class refers to that the video become public during the time for 2022 Winter Olympics in Beijing. The submarine was filmed on Yangtze River downstream from Wuhan, where two submarine shipyards are located.

The length of the submarine is estimated in the range .

References

Submarine classes
Submarines of China